"R.I.C.O." is a song by American hip hop recording artist Meek Mill, released as the third single from his second studio album Dreams Worth More Than Money, on June 29, 2015. The song features fellow rapper, Canadian recording artist Drake. The song was produced by Vinylz, Allen Ritter and Cubeatz. The song's title refers to the "Racketeer Influenced and Corrupt Organizations" Act.

Controversy
On July 22, 2015, Meek Mill publicly criticized the rapper Drake on Twitter, after being upset with Drake's non-involvement with the promotion of the album, claiming that he uses ghostwriters to write his song texts.
The controversy garnered Drake to respond with two diss songs within a week titled, "Charged Up", and "Back to Back". Meek Mill responded with a counter-diss on July 31, 2015 with a diss song called "Wanna Know".

Track listing
 Digital single

Charts

Weekly charts

Year-end charts

Certifications

References

External links

Lyrics of this song at Genius

2015 songs
2015 singles
Meek Mill songs
Drake (musician) songs
Songs written by Drake (musician)
Song recordings produced by Vinylz
Song recordings produced by Cubeatz
Maybach Music Group singles
Songs written by Vinylz
Songs written by Meek Mill
Songs written by Allen Ritter
Songs written by Kevin Gomringer
Songs written by Tim Gomringer
Song recordings produced by Allen Ritter